Ellul is a Maltese surname. Notable people with the surname include:

 Anthony Ellul (born August 1966), Maltese judge
 Jacques Ellul (1912–1994), French philosopher, sociologist, theologian, and Christian anarchist
 Massimo Ellul (born 1970), Maltese businessman

See also
 Elul or אלול, the last month in the Jewish calendar